"If You Want My Lovin'" is a song released by American singer Evelyn "Champagne" King. Released on April 3, 1981, The song appears on the album I'm in Love. The single version of "If You Want My Lovin'" was the follow-up to her charting single "I'm in Love," but less successful.

Single version

"If You Want My Lovin'" was also released as a single.  This version of "If You Want My Lovin'" is the less-successful follow-up to Evelyn's charting single "I'm In Love."

Track listing 
12" version

7" version

Personnel
Percussion – Bashiri Johnson
Producer, arranger, handclaps, lyrics by – Morrie Brown
Assistant producer, arranger, keyboards, lyrics by, music by – Lawrence Jones
Assistant engineer – Cheryl Smith, Dennis O'Donnell
Mixed by, recorded by – "Magic Hands", Steve Goldman
Mastered by – George Marino
Assistant producer, backing vocals, handclaps, keyboards, Moog synthesizer – Kashif
Guitar – Ira Siegel
Additional engineer – Pete Sobel
String arrangement – Ralph Schuckett
Backing vocals – B.J. Nelson, Evelyn King, Rochele Cappelli
Drums, handclaps – Leslie Ming

References

Evelyn "Champagne" King songs
1980 songs
1981 singles